Federspiel is a Germanic surname that literally means "feather play". The name originates in Switzerland. Notable people with the surname include:

Ben Federspiel (born 1981), Luxembourgian footballer
Birgitte Federspiel (1925–2005), Danish actress
Ejner Federspiel (1896–1981), Danish actor
Frederikke Federspiel (1839–1913), Danish photographer
Joe Federspiel (born 1950), American football player
Jürg Federspiel (1931–2007), Swiss writer
Per Federspiel (1905–1994), Danish politician

Other uses
Federspiel (wine), a wine classification term in the Austrian region of Wachau